Snail Mail No More is a book published in 2000 by Paula Danziger and Ann M. Martin. It is the sequel to P.S. Longer Letter Later and is about the relationship between two long-distance friends, Elizabeth and Tara.

Plot
After a year of snail mail following, long-distance friends Elizabeth Richardson and Tara*Starr Lane are ready for the more immediate gratification of e-mail. Because the emails take so little time to send, the two have an even closer relationship.  Now in eighth grade, the girls send emails to each other about their fast-changing lives.

Tara* Starr is getting used to having a baby sister, Scarlett, in the house, who was born prematurely and becomes a source of worry to the family, and how a social studies project ruined her relationship with her boyfriend Bart.  Meanwhile, Elizabeth's father has returned, to the disappointment of Elizabeth's entire family.  However, the family is deeply affected when Elizabeth's father is caught in a fatal car crash.  Elizabeth comes to realize that a chapter of her life has closed, but another is still beginning.  In the process, the girls' friendship improves, despite their distance.

References

2000 American novels
2000 children's books
American children's novels
Sequel novels
Epistolary novels
Collaborative novels
Novels set in Ohio